The 2015–16 ABA League was the 15th season of the ABA League, with 14 teams from Serbia, Croatia, Slovenia, Montenegro, Bosnia and Herzegovina and Macedonia participating in it.

Regular season started on October 1, 2015, and finished on March 7, 2016 followed by playoffs of the four best placed teams.

Teams

Personnel and sponsorship

Coaching changes

Regular season

Standings

Schedule and results
The regular season began on October 1, 2015, and ended on March 7, 2016.

Playoffs

Semifinals

Game 1

Game 2

Finals

2015–2016 Crvena Zvezda Team Roster

Individual statistics

Rating

Points

Rebounds

Assists

Source: ABA League Individual Statistics

MVP List

MVP of the Round

Source: ABA League MVP List

MVP of the Month

The ideal five of the season
''The ideal five of the season were selected by head coaches, fans and the ABA League Commission, with the coaches contributing 60%, the fans 30% and the Commission 10% of the votes for the final result.

ABA League clubs in European competitions

Notes

References

External links
 Official website
 ABA League at Eurobasket.com

2015–16
2015–16 in European basketball leagues
2015–16 in Serbian basketball
2015–16 in Slovenian basketball
2015–16 in Croatian basketball
2015–16 in Bosnia and Herzegovina basketball
2015–16 in Montenegrin basketball
2015–16 in Hungarian basketball
2015–16 in Republic of Macedonia basketball